Prof. Monica Partridge born Monica Agnes McMain (25 May 1915 – 2008) was a British linguist and Russian and Serbo-Croatian scholar who was a benefactor to the University of Nottingham. She was the first woman to be a Professor at her university.

Life 
Partridge was born on 25 May 1915 in Nottingham to Florence Emma Marjorie born Roberts and John McMain. Her father was a teacher. She studied French at Nottingham University but later became intrigued by Russian. She began to study Russian at the School of Slavonic and East European Studies in London, in 1940. She undertook post graduate studies with Professor Simon Boyanus and won the Laura Soames Prize for her study of the phonetics of Russian.

Partridge did some (assistant) lecturing at University College London. After the war in 1947 she worked at her alma mater as a tutorial assistant.

She was encouraged by Janko Lavrin to begin a doctorate and she undertook a thesis into the time that Alexander Herzen spent in Russia. She would in time become an acknowledged expert on Herzen. In 1949 she was appointed to a lectureship in Russian at Nottingham as an Assistant Lecturer to Lavrin. Each summer she went to Slovenia where she established links with the University of Ljubljana. Because of her interest the University of Nottingham was able to establish student exchanges which also improved the opportunities for Yugoslav students. In 1967 she became the first woman to be appointed a Professor at Nottingham University.

She led the university's department of Slavic studies until she retired in 1980. After she retired she was recognised as an emeritus professor. The Yugoslav government awarded her the Order of the Flag with Star. In 1990, when she was 75, a presentation was made to her of a series of essays titled "The Bell of Freedom". In 1993 she published a book detailing her studies of Alexander Herzen. When she died on 19 March 2008 she left a bequest to the university which assisted students to be granted fellowships. In 2020 she was honoured by having a university building named after her.

References

Further reading
 

1915 births
2008 deaths
People from Nottingham
British women academics
Academics of the University of Nottingham
Alumni of the University of Nottingham
Slavists